Gyula Németh (born 2 December 1959) is a retired Hungarian high jumper.

He finished fourteenth at the 1983 European Indoor Championships, and eighth at the 1988 European Indoor Championships. He became Hungarian high jump champion in 1986 and 1989.

External links 

 Gyula Németh  at All-Athletics.com

References

1959 births
Living people
Hungarian male high jumpers